"Short Dick Man" is a song by American hip house group 20 Fingers featuring rapper Gillette. It was released in August 1994 on Zoo Entertainment and SOS Records as their debut single from their album, On the Attack and More. It also appears on 20 Fingers' second self-titled studio album and on Gillette's debut solo album, On the Attack. The tune was a global success,  particularly in Brazil, France and Italy. In France and Italy, this was a number-one hit. It also reached number three in Germany, number four in Australia, number six in Austria and the Wallonia region of Belgium, and number seven in the Netherlands and New Zealand.

Background
This single, which involves women mocking the size of a man's penis, was also released in a toned down version replacing the word "dick" with "short", along with rearranged lyrics (this version was also released under the censored title "Short Short Man"). Co-writer Manfred Mohr told the Los Angeles Times that the point of the song was to attract attention. "We figured there were all these songs by men bashing women and treating women like sex objects. So we decided a song that turned the tables on men might attract some attention." According to the vocalist Sandra Gillette, the point of the song is to "strike back at all the women-bashing songs in pop, especially in rap." Some radio stations refused to play the song as it was deemed controversial.

Critical reception
Larry Flick from Billboard described the song as a "goofy dance novelty single", adding that "comical female rants on the shortcomings of a lover are woven into a rigid groove. 'Clean' version has daintily been retitled 'Short short Man', bleeping out all blunt penis references." BuzzFeed ranked it at number 54 in their list of "The 101 Greatest Dance Songs Of the '90s" in 2017. David Browne from Entertainment Weekly commented, "'Short Short Man' (also known as 'Short D — – Man'), with a hard, thumping beat and, er, a harder message: 'You need some tweezers to put that little thing away?' Gillette taunts. Ouch! If those jibes don't hurt enough, they're followed by synthesizer bleeps of mocking laughter."

Robbie Daw from Idolator said it "became a dance-crossover sensation — due, largely, to attention-grabbing lyrics like these: 'That has got to be the smallest dick I have ever seen in my whole life / Get the fuck outta here! He added, "In many ways, the song played at the time like the female response to hits by male artists that objectified women, such as 'Rump Shaker' and 'Bump N' Grind' — and the music-buying masses, er, grabbed on tightly, thanks to slightly-edited (read: cleaned up) version, 'Short short Man', being put into heavy rotation." Andy Beevers from Music Week rated it three out of five, adding that "this house track features a fiercely funny verbal assault that leaves little to imagination." He also concluded: "The track is not likely to get any radio play, but has been making up for it with plenty of club exposure."

James Hamilton from their RM Dance Update described it as a "hilarious bitchy comments prodded sparse bouncily jolting" song. Wendi Cermak from The Network Forty wrote that "a throbbing base line that's not bogged down by over-production complements the eloquent - and slightly politically incorrect - vocals." Also Pete Stanton from Smash Hits gave it three out of five, saying, "Annoying beat, strange quirky noises, and the dodgiest lyrics in town. Let's just say it's about some girl complaining about some fella's tidgy widger."

Chart performance
"Short Dick Man" proved to be successful on the charts all over the world, peaking at number two on the RPM Dance/Urban chart in Canada and number three on the Billboard Hot Dance Club Play chart in the United States. In Europe, the single went to number-one
in both France and Italy. It made it to the top 10 also in Austria, Belgium, Germany and the Netherlands, as well as on the Eurochart Hot 100, where it peaked at number seven. Additionally, "Short Dick Man" was a top 20 hit in Scotland and the United Kingdom. In the latter, it peaked at number eleven in its second run at the UK Singles Chart, on September 24, 1995. But on the UK Dance Chart, it was a even bigger hit, reaching number three. In Oceania, the single charted at number four and seven in Australia and New Zealand. On the US Billboard Hot 100, it reached number 14, while on the Canadian The Record singles chart, it reached number six. It earned a gold record in Germany and the US, with a sale of 250,000 and 500,000 singles, and a silver record
in France, when 125,000 units were sold there.

Music video
A music video was made for "Short Dick Man", directed by Daniel Zirilli.

Cover versions
In 1995, the song was covered by Machito Ponce and Diamanda Turbin as "Short Dick Man (¡Ponte A Brincar!)". In 2007, the song was covered by Laurent Wolf, featuring Marilyn David. This 3:35 version is available on several compilations, such as Été 2007 and Contact Play & Dance vol. 4.

Formats and track listings

 CD single
 "Short Dick Man" (radio mix) — 3:16
 "Short Dick Man" (J.J. energy mix radio edit) — 3:20

 CD maxi
 "Short Dick Man" (Radio Mix) — 3:21
 "Short Dick Man" (Bass Mix) — 4:54
 "Short Dick Man" (Jazzy Mix) — 4:51
 "Short Dick Man" (Accapella) — 4:23
 "Short Dick Man" (Club Mix) — 4:50
 "Short Dick Man" (J.J. Energy Mix) — 4:39
 "Short Dick Man" (Insane Mix) — 5:07
 "Short Dick Man" (Dub Mix) — 2:41

 12-inch maxi
 "Short Dick Man" (club mix) — 4:48
 "Short Dick Man" (a cappella) — 4:17
 "Short Dick Man" (bass mix) — 4:51
 "Short Dick Man" (radio edit) — 3:16

 CD maxi - Italian remixes
 "Short Dick Man" (heavy dick version) — 10:33
 "Short Dick Man" (aladino remix) — 5:04
 "Short Dick Man" (pagany "the sound" remix) — 6:10
 "Short Dick Man" (Ti.Pi.Cal. planet remix) — 8:33
 "Short Dick Man" (unity 3 bip remix) — 6:01
 "Short Dick DJ" (Old Betsy - NoiseLab Crew remix) - 4:29

Personnel
 Written by Charlie Babie and Manfred Mohr
 Vocals by Gillette
 Mastered by Mark Richardson, at Metropolis Mastering, Chicago
 Produced by Charlie Babie
 Mixed by Onofrio Lollino and J.J. Flores
 Published by Tango Rose Music (ASCAP)
 Distributed by ID Records, 1994

Charts

Weekly charts
20 Fingers version

Machito Ponce version

Year-end charts

Certifications

Release history

See also
 List of French number-one hits of 1995

References

1994 debut singles
1994 songs
20 Fingers songs
Multiply Records singles
Novelty songs
Number-one singles in Italy
Obscenity controversies in music
SNEP Top Singles number-one singles
Zoo Entertainment (record label) singles
ZYX Music singles